Súni Olsen (born 7 March 1981) is a Faroese former professional football midfielder.

Club career
He started his career at Faroese club GÍ Gøta, after a successful season in 2000, in which he scored 13 league goals, moved to Dutch side FC Zwolle in 2001, becoming the second Faroese international to play in the Netherlands after Jan Allan Müller played for Go Ahead Eagles in 1990/1991. He returned to GÍ in 2002, and after a prolific number of goals for a midfielder, he attracted the attention of Danish team AaB, where he was later joined by Faroese teammate Jón Rói Jacobsen. In 2008, he was allowed to leave to Viborg on a free transfer, after failing to break into the first-team squad at Aalborg. After a disappointing season at Viborg FF, he left Denmark and returned to the Faroe Islands at B36 Tórshavn. He played 2 games before he broke his foot and then did not play another match for B36. In October 2008, he agreed to leave B36 for Jógvan Martin Olsen's new side, Víkingur. In November 2015, Olsen signed for KÍ Klaksvík.

International career
Olsen made his debut for the Faroe Islands national football team in January 2001, in a Nordic Championship match against Sweden, coming on as a substitute for Sámal Joensen. He played magnificently against Estonia in a friendly in Summer 2008, scoring one goal and making two assists, bringing the Faroe Islands level, after being 3-0 down at half time. On 15 October 2013, Suni Olsen retired from International football following an 2014 FIFA World Cup qualification match against Austria.

International goals
Scores and results list Faroe Islands' goal tally first.

External links
AaB profile
His profile on FaroeSoccer.com

1981 births
Living people
People from Tórshavn
Faroese footballers
Faroe Islands international footballers
PEC Zwolle players
AaB Fodbold players
Viborg FF players
Danish Superliga players
Víkingur Gøta players
B36 Tórshavn players
GÍ Gøta players
Faroese expatriate footballers
Expatriate footballers in the Netherlands
Association football midfielders
Faroe Islands youth international footballers
Outfield association footballers who played in goal